Palmetto State Park is a state park located in Gonzales County, Texas, United States northwest of Gonzales and southeast of Luling. The land was acquired by deeds from private owners and the City of Gonzales in 1934 - 1936 and was opened in 1936.

Features
The park is named for the dwarf palmetto (Sabal minor), which grows abundantly in the park. The San Marcos River runs through the park.  The  Oxbow Lake, initially created by flood waters, is now independent of the river and is spring fed. There are many bogs throughout the park that are surrounded by dense vegetation, giving the park a jungle-like atmosphere.

The park was constructed by Civilian Conservation Corps (CCC) Companies 873 and 886 between 1934 and 1937. The CCC built Park Road 11, a low water crossing on the San Marcos River, a water tower/storage building, refectory, and residence (currently the park headquarters), barbeque pits, picnic seating, rock pool and retention dams, rock table, culverts, concrete picnic tables, and two sets of entrance portals.

Flora
In addition to the dwarf palmetto, live oak, bur oak, honey mesquite, Mexican plum, red buckeye, anacua, rattan vine, Texas spiderwort and poison ivy are prevalent in the park.

Fauna
White-tailed deer are common throughout the park, as are raccoons, nine-banded armadillos, and fox squirrels. Over 240 species of birds such as the pileated woodpecker, and Kentucky warbler have been recorded within the park's boundaries. Some of the birds often spotted include the prothonotary warbler, and red-shouldered hawk.

See also
 List of Texas state parks

References

External links

 Texas Parks and Wildlife: Palmetto State Park
Film of Palmetto State Park from Adventure at Our Door (c. 1959) on the Texas Archive of the Moving Image

State parks of Texas
Protected areas of Gonzales County, Texas
Civilian Conservation Corps in Texas